The World University Cross Country Championships is an international biennial cross country running competition for student athletes, organised by the International University Sports Federation (FISU). The 2012 edition of the competition featured 76 male and 61 female athletes from 23 countries. Over the history of the event, 64 countries have competed but only three (France, Great Britain and Spain) have been present at all editions of the championships.

First established in 1968 as a men's only event, a women's race was added in 1976 and FISU gave the event its official sanctioning two years later. The programme of each championship consists of one men's and one women's race, with prizes being available for individuals and national teams. The team races are decided by comparing the sum of the finishing places of each nation's top four finishers (for men) or top three finishers (for women). Each country may enter up to six male athletes and five female athletes. A mixed-sex relay was introduced at the 2022 edition.

The 2020 edition set for Marrakech was postponed due to the COVID-19 pandemic.

All editions of the competition up to 2006 were hosted by Western European countries. Algiers became the first African nation to host the event in 2006 and Kingston, Ontario brought it to North America for the first time in 2010. Although the competition is limited to athletes studying at university level, the championships has nevertheless attract top level competitors, including: World Championship medallists Steve Moneghetti and Mariem Alaoui Selsouli, as well as World Cross Country team medallists Antonio Serrano and Iulia Olteanu.

Editions

Medallists

Men

Men's team

Women

Women's team

Mixed relay

See also
Athletics at the Summer Universiade

References

Editions and medallists.
World Student Cross Country Championship. GBR Athletics. Retrieved on 2012-04-22.
Medals at WUC Cross Country 1978 – 2010. FISU. Retrieved on 2012-04-22.

External links
FISU official website
2012 edition website
2016 edition website

Cross country running competitions
Recurring sporting events established in 1968
Cross Country
Athletics team events